King's speech may refer to:

 Speech from the throne when the monarch is male, delivered by a king (or representative) outlining his government's agenda
 State Opening of Parliament, beginning of a session of the Parliament of the United Kingdom
 Royal Christmas Message, broadcast made by the sovereign of the Commonwealth realms to the Commonwealth of Nations each Christmas
 Special address by the British monarch, made by the sovereign of the Commonwealth realms at times of significant national or royal events
 A King's Speech, a 2009 radio play by Mark Burgess about King George VI
 The King's Speech, a 2010 film about King George VI written by David Seidler
 The King's Speech (play), a 2012 stage play based on the film written by David Seidler
 The King's Speech: How One Man Saved the British Monarchy, a biography by Peter Conradi and Mark Logue